Futboll Klub Kukësi is an Albanian professional football club based in the city of Kukës. The club plays its home games at the Zeqir Ymeri Stadium and they currently compete in the Kategoria Superiore, the highest tier of Albanian football. The club played in the lower divisions for much of its history since 1930, prior to their 2012 promotion to Kategoria Superiore, where they have finished as runners up in three of the four top flight campaigns they have had.

History

Early history
The club was formed on 4 March 1930 in Kukës under the name as Shoqëria Sportive Kosova, around the same time as the rise in widespread popularity of football in Albania. The club was initially made up of young men from Has, Lumë and Gora, who competed in sports such as athletics and wrestling along with football, which quickly became the most popular sport to follow in Kukës. The club's first ever game was played on 20 April 1930 against Internati Krumë, which ended in a 0–0 draw. On 13 July the club lost for the first time against Dibra in Peshkopi, in a game which ended 4–1 to the opposition. In August 1931 the club competed in a local tournament where they played Kallabaku (Borje), Shkëlzeni (Tropojë), Internati Krumë, and teams from the military. With the establishment of the Albanian Football Association in 1932 Shoqëria Sportive Kosova was registered under the name Sport Klub Kosova. However, they did not participate in any of the national championships that were held at the time. In 1949, following the end of World War II, the Albanian Football Association resumed its championships. In 1953 Shoqëria Sportive Kosova participated for the first time in a national competition, competing in the Albanian Third Division.

Përparimi
In 1958 the club was promoted to the Albanian Second Division for the first time, and they changed their name to Klubi Sportiv Përparimi at the same time. The club's first major trophy came in 1967, winning the Albanian Third Division and achieving promotion for the first time to the Albanian Second Division. They remained in the league for a decade until 1977, when they won the Second Division title, the club's biggest achievement since its formation in 1930. Despite being relegated quickly, the club once again won the Second Division in 1982 and were promoted again to Albania's second tier. Many consider the late 1970s and early 1980s to be the club's so-called golden era.

With the fall of communism in Albania in 1991, the club experienced huge financial problems as they had relied on state funding to run the club for many years. The municipality of Kukës along with local businessmen began to fund the team following the end of Albania's Communism regime, but due to the lack of funds the club did not experience any success for nearly two decades after Communism.

Kukësi

In 2010 the club experienced a complete revamp, changing its name for a third time to Futboll Klub Kukësi. The Kukës representative in the Parliament of Albania and member of the Democratic Party of Albania, Fatos Hoxha was elected as president of FK Kukësi. The club aimed to reach Kategoria Superiore for the first time in its history, investing heavily for the 2010–11 season in order to achieve promotion from the Second Division. Fatos Hoxha and the Municipality of Kukës hired Shahin Berberi as the club's manager and gave him the financial backing to make many signings in order to achieve promotion. Berberi did just that and FK Kukësi were crowned winners of the Albanian Second Division at the end of the 2010–11 season. The following season the club once again invested heavily, this time to achieve their aim of top flight football, an aim which was achieved at the end of the 2011–12 season, as FK Kukësi finished second in the table and received automatic promotion to Kategoria Superiore for the 2012–13 season.

Kategoria Superiore era
2012–13
The club's first-ever top-flight game was against fellow newly-promoted side Luftëtari Gjirokastër on 26 August 2012 at the Zeqir Ymeri Stadium, and it ended in a goalless draw in front of just over 2,500 spectators. They remained unbeaten in the league for the opening ten games, which included an away win against Albania's most decorated side KF Tirana. Their unbeaten start to life in Kategoria Superiore came to an end on 17 November in a 2–0 loss to Flamurtari Vlorë. They ended the season in second place behind Skënderbeu Korçë, whom they defeated 4–3 on the last day of the season. FK Kukësi's season was considered a tremendous success, considering the club's humble history, which did not stop them collecting memorable wins throughout the 2012–13 campaign including a 6–1 win over Flamurtari Vlorë and a 5–1 win over Shkumbini Peqin. They were featured as UEFA's surprise package, as they were the only team to finish the season unbeaten at home and their second-placed finish earned them a place in the UEFA Europa League first qualifying round. They finished the season with a record of 15 wins, 7 draws and 4 losses, along with a points tally of 52 and a positive goal difference of 24.

2013–14
FK Kukësi's first European game was played on 4 July 2013 and it ended in a 1–1 draw away at Estonian side Flora Tallinn, with midfielder Gerhard Progni scoring a 79th-minute equaliser. The return leg was played at the Qemal Stafa Stadium in Tiranë and it ended in goalless draw which meant that FK Kukësi progressed to the second qualifying round of the Europa League on the away goal rule. In the next round FK Kukësi met Bosnian side FK Sarajevo, whom they defeated 3–2 at the Qemal Stafa Stadium in the first leg, thanks to goals from Yll Hoxha, Lazar Popović and Igli Allmuça. In the second leg played at the Asim Ferhatović Hase Stadium, the match ended goalless which meant FK Kukësi progressed to the third and final qualifying round of the competition. They faced Metalurh Donetsk from Ukraine in the next round and they shocked the Ukrainians with a 2–0 win in Tiranë, courtesy of goals from Lucas Malacarne and Renato Malota. FK Kukësi experienced their first European defeat in their sixth fixture at the hands of Metalurh Donetsk in the away leg of the tie, but still progressed through to the play-off round as they won 2–1 on aggregate over the two games. In the play-offs they were drawn against a far larger club in the shape of Turkish side Trabzonspor, who they faced at home in the first leg which ended in a predictable 2–0 loss. At the Hüseyin Avni Aker Stadium in the second leg FK Kukësi managed to open the scoring through Lazar Popović in the 11th minute, before conceding three times to lose 5–1 on aggregate. The club's European run was widely reported both in Albania and in the region, and the players were considered heroes for overcoming their underdog status both domestically and continentally.

They began the 2013–14 season in poor form, losing their opening game to newly promoted side KF Lushnja before being comprehensively beaten 3–0 at home by Vllaznia Shkodër, leaving them in the relegation zone and second from bottom after two games played. However, they quickly bounced back to beat the reigning champions Skënderbeu Korçë 3–1, before drawing to Teuta Durrës and beating Kastrioti Krujë to lift them out of the relegation zone. They lost their following game against Partizani Tirana which resulted in the head coach Armando Cungu being replaced by Naci Şensoy, whose reign at FK Kukësi began with two draws and a loss that landed the club back in the relegation zone. From week 10 however, they went on a four match winning streak which was ended by a 1–1 draw with Skënderbeu Korçë. However, the head coach Şensoy was under pressure from both the fans and the president Safet Gjici, and after winning just once in his next four league games he resigned immediately after a goalless draw at home against Bylis Ballsh. The club's technical director Sulejman Starova took over as head coach until the end of the season, having last managed in 2010 while he was in charge of KF Tirana. Starova began with a disappointing 2–0 loss to relegation bound Besa Kavajë, before beating Flamurtari Vlorë and KF Laçi consecutively to regain some momentum for a late title push. Hopes of winning the title dampened following a 3–1 defeat by KF Tirana in week 22, despite losing just once in their last eleven games, which saw them win seven times, to finish comfortably in second place, four points behind Skënderbeu Korçë and three points ahead of KF Laçi who finished first and third respectively. They also had a strong Albanian Cup run, as they eliminated Naftëtari Kuçovë, Apolonia Fier, Bylis Ballsh and Teuta Durrës to reach the final with Flamurtari Vlorë which they eventually lost 1–0 to an Arbër Abilaliaj goal.

Stadium

Kukësi's home venue is the Zeqir Ymeri Stadium, which is a 9,500 seater stadium located near the centre of Kukës. The existing stadium was completed in 2012, and the club had previously played on a field located in the same position that the stadium was built over, and the previous ground was named the Përparimi Stadium until 2010, after the club's name at the time which was Përparimi Kukës. The ground previously consisted of a playing field surrounded by grass where fans would watch games from, as the club has spent the vast majority of its history in the lower leagues of Albanian football thus there was no requirement to build a stadium for a small local club.

In July 2010 work began to start building the stadium, which was funded jointly by the Albanian Football Association, Municipality of Kukës and UEFA, who invested the €800,000 needed to begin work on the stadium. The ground was given the name Zeqir Ymeri in honour of a former footballer for the club, and the opening of the stadium was on 30 November 2010, where a friendly was played against Partizani Tirana, which FK Kukësi won 1–0. Once the club achieved promotion to Kategoria Superiore in 2012 the stadium did not meet the requirements needed to compete in the top flight, which led to further investment on the ground, which resulted in an intensive reconstruction program during the summer of 2012 in order to get the stadium ready for the 2012–13 season. The stadium was given a seated capacity of over 9,000 spectators and all the required amenities were added in order to meet the league requirements, and the it was reopened on 1 October 2012 with a total reconstruction cost of €1.076,000.

Supporters

The club is well supported in the local community of Kukës as well as the surrounding regions in the north-east, and the main ultras group is called the Armata e Veriut, which translates to the Army of the North. The supporters have been known for some negative behaviour, which included a top of the table clash with Luftëtari Gjirokastër on 6 May 2012 in the Albanian First Division, where the FK Kukësi fans were seen throwing object onto the field which resulted in the referee Lorenc Jemini having to pause the game. The game eventually restarted, but the club was punished by the Albanian Football Association with a six match stadium ban, meaning they had to play their next six home games behind closed doors. The club was fined a total of €27,000 for the behaviour of its supporters during their Europa League run in the summer of 2013, as they threw bottles and flares onto the field of their home games against Sarajevo and Metalurh Donetsk.

FK Kukësi's main rivalries have been with small local clubs such as Pashtriku Has, which is considered the Kukës country derby; a derby which FK Kukësi has typically dominated. The club's other rivalries are with Korabi Peshkopi and Tërbuni Pukë, which are the north-east derbies. More recently however, the club has seen a rivalry grow with Kategoria Superiore's biggest clubs, which especially includes Skënderbeu Korçë whom they finished runners-up in the leaguer to in three consequeitve season; the 2012–13, 2013–14 and 2014–15 campaigns respectively.

European competitions

Overview

Matches

Notes
 1Q: First qualifying round
 2Q: Second qualifying round
 3Q: Third qualifying round
 PO: Play-off Round

Honours

League titles
 Kategoria Superiore
Winners (1): 2016–17
 Kategoria e Dytë
Winners (4): 1966–67, 1976–77, 1981–82, 2010–11

Cups
 Albanian Cup
Winners (2): 2015–16, 2018–19
 Albanian Supercup
Winners (1): 2016

Recent seasons

World & European Rankings

UEFA club coefficient ranking

Players

Current squad

Youth/B-team players in use 2021-22

Other players under contract

Personnel

Historical list of managers

 Shahin Berberi (1 July 2010 - 1 July 2012)
 Armando Cungu (1 July 2012 - 2 October 2013)
 Naci Şensoy (3 October 2013 - 10 February 2014)
 Sulejman Starova  (11 February 2014 - 31 May 2014)
 Agim Canaj  (2 June 2014 - 20 July 2014)
 Artim Šakiri  (10 August 2014 - 27 April 2015)
 Miodrag Radanović  (28 April 2015 - 14 June 2015)
 Marcello Troisi (15 June 2015 - 23 November 2015)
 Klodian Duro (24 November 2015 - 31 May 2016)
 Hasan Lika (6 June 2016 -22 July 2016)
 Ernest Gjoka (22 July 2016 – 29 July 2017)
 Mladen Milinković  (30 July 2017 – 22 December 2017)
 Peter Pacult  (3 January 2018 - 13 July 2018)
 Armando Cungu (13 Jul 2018 - 13 March 2019)
 Ramadan Shehu  (19 March 2019 - 6 April 2019)
 Ernest Gjoka (7 April 2019 - 19 July 2019)
 Shpëtim Duro (25July 2019 - 29 February 2020)
 Orges Shehi  (2 March 2020 - 30 July 2020)
 Skënder Gega  (30 July 2020 - 27 December 2020)
 Rrahman Hallaçi  (28 December 2020 - 25 January 2021)
 Mirel Josa (25 January 2021 – 5 June 2021)
 Diego Longo (6 June 2021 - 26 May 2022)
 Skënder Gega (28 May 2022 - 9 September 2022)
 Enkeleid Dobi (9 September 2022 - 11 December 2022)
 Rrahman Hallaçi (11 December 2022 - )

References

External links
Official Website
FK Kukësi at UEFA.COM

 
Kukesi
1930 establishments in Albania
Association football clubs established in 1930
Kukës
Kategoria e Dytë clubs